The 2017 World RX of Hockenheim was the third round of the fourth season of the FIA World Rallycross Championship. The event was held at the Hockenheimring in Hockenheim, Baden-Württemberg, alongside the Deutsche Tourenwagen Masters.

Supercar

Heats

Semi-finals
Semi-Final 1

Semi-Final 2

Final

Standings after the event

 Note: Only the top five positions are included.

References

External links

|- style="text-align:center"
|width="35%"|Previous race:2017 World RX of Portugal
|width="30%"|FIA World Rallycross Championship2017 season
|width="35%"|Next race:2017 World RX of Belgium
|- style="text-align:center"
|width="35%"|Previous race:2016 World RX of Hockenheim
|width="30%"|World RX of Hockenheim
|width="35%"|Next race:Incumbent
|- style="text-align:center"

Hockenheim
World RX, Hockenheim
World RX